A lady's maid is a female personal attendant who waits on her female employer. The role of a lady's maid is similar to that of a gentleman's valet.

Description
Traditionally, the lady's maid was not as high-ranking as a lady's companion, who was a retainer rather than a servant, but the rewards included room and board, travel and somewhat improved social status. In the servants' hall, a lady's maid took precedence akin to that of her mistress. In Britain, a lady's maid would be addressed by her surname by her employer, while she was addressed as "Miss" by junior servants or when visiting another servants' hall.  

A lady's maid's specific duties included helping her mistress with her appearance, including make-up, hairdressing, clothing, jewellery, and shoes. A lady's maid would also remove stains from clothing; sew, mend, and alter garments as needed; bring her mistress breakfast in her room; and draw her mistress's bath. However, she would not be expected to dust and clean every small item, as that would be the job of a housemaid.

Examples of lady's maids
 Catherine Bellier (1614–1689),  to the Queen of France, Anne of Austria.
 Maria Molina (17th century),  to the Queen of France, Maria Theresa of Spain.
 Juliana Schierberg (d. 1712), lady's maid to princess Hedvig Sophia of Sweden.
 Nicole du Hausset (1713–1801), lady's maid to Madame de Pompadour.
 Juliane von Schwellenberg (1728–1797), lady's maid to Charlotte of Mecklenburg-Strelitz, queen of Great Britain.
 Ingrid Maria Wenner (1731–1793), lady's maid to Sophia Magdalena of Denmark, queen of Sweden.
 Julie Louise Bibault de Misery (1732–1804),  to the Queen of France Marie Antoinette.
 Maria Perekusikhina (1739–1824), lady's maid to empress Catherine the Great.
 Jeanne Louise Henriette Campan (1752–1822),  to the Queen of France, Marie Antoinette.
 Marianne Skerrett (1793–1887), the principal lady's maid (with the title "Dresser") to Queen Victoria of the United Kingdom between 1837 and 1862. 
 Bertha Zück (1797–1868), lady's maid to Josephine of Leuchtenberg, queen of Sweden.
 Frieda Arnold (fl. 1854–fl. 1859), lady's maid to Queen Victoria of the United Kingdom between 1854 and 1859.
 Pepa Pollet (fl. 1870), lady's maid to Eugénie de Montijo, empress of France.
 Marie von Flotow (1817–1909), the lady's maid and influential favourite of the Russian Empress Maria Feodorovna (Dagmar of Denmark).
 Anna Demidova (1878–1918), lady's maid to Alexandra Feodorovna (Alix of Hesse), tsaritsa of Russia

Fictional lady's maids
Susanna in Mozart's 1786 opera The Marriage of Figaro
Martha Abbott, Mrs. Reed's maid in Charlotte Brontë's 1847 novel Jane Eyre
Mrs. Firkin, Miss Crawley's maid in William Makepeace Thackeray's 1847 novel Vanity Fair
Joan Valentine in P. G. Wodehouse's 1915 novel Something Fresh, and Claire Lippett in Wodehouse's 1925 novel Sam the Sudden
Hildegarde Schmidt in Agatha Christie's novel Murder on the Orient Express (1934), and Louise Bourget in Christie's Death on the Nile (1937)
Clarice in Daphne du Maurier's 1938 novel Rebecca.
Dora Moxton in Noël Coward's 1951 play Relative Values
Rose Buck and Maud Roberts in the television series Upstairs, Downstairs (1971–1975)
Jeanette Robbins in the television series Dynasty (1981–1989)
Mary MacEachran in the film Gosford Park (2001)
Sakuya Izayoi from the Touhou Project game series, lady's maid to Remilia Scarlet.
Brigitte, Brigitta, Olivia, and Priscilla in the 2004 film The Princess Diaries 2: Royal Engagement
Sophie Collins, Jessamine's maid in Cassandra Clare's book trilogy The Infernal Devices (2010–2013)
Anna Bates, Sarah O'Brien, and Phyllis Baxter in the television series Downton Abbey (2010–2015)
Madri Visudharomn and Patravadee Varoprakorn in the Crazy Rich Asians franchise (2013–present)
Gwynne in the 2015–2016 television series Galavant

See also
 Chamber woman
 Domestic worker
 French maid
 Handmaiden
 Housekeeper
 Maid
 
 Valet

References 

 Lady
Domestic work